Kunal Kumar (born 6 December 1978) is an Indian Bollywood Actor Well known for his role of Balu in India's First Silent comedy Gutur Gu.

Television
 School days (1999)
 Ssshhhh...Koi Hai - Khel Khel Mein (2001) as Rahul (Episode 13)
 Kkusum (2001) as Cyrus
 Kumkum - Ek Pyara Sa Bandhan (2004) as Uday
 Ayushmaan (2005) as News Reporter
Kya Aap Paanchvi Fail Champu Hain? (2008) as Gaurav Sanguly
Gutur Gu (2010-2012) as Balu Kumar 
Khidki-Channo Bhaag Gayi (2016) as Ranveer/Channo

Films
[[Saathiya (film)|Saathiya]] (2002) as Bhaskar 
Main Hoon Naa (2004) as Shastri 
Bunty aur Babli (2005) as Newspaper Salesman 
Namastey London (2007)  
Kaisay Kahein... (2007) 
Superstar (2008)  
Maan Gaye Mughal-e-Azam (2008)  
Ek Vivaah... Aisa Bhi (2008)  
Dasvidaniya (2008)  
Hum Phirr Milein Na Milein (2009) as Adi  
Bachelor Party (2009) as Sawant  
Do Knot Disturb (2009) as The Bellboy  
Payback (2010) as Rohit Sharma  
Love U...Mr. Kalakaar! (2011) 
Kucch Luv Jaisaa (2011) as Mahendra/Monty  
Miley Naa Miley Hum (2011) as Prateek

References

Male actors from Haryana
1987 births
Living people
People from Faridabad